Arie Vooren (11 January 1923 – 3 June 1988) was a Dutch racing cyclist. He rode in the 1947 Tour de France.

References

External links

1923 births
1988 deaths
Dutch male cyclists
Sportspeople from Beverwijk
Cyclists from North Holland